Uchkoʻprik District is a district of Fergana Region in Uzbekistan. The capital lies at the town Uchkoʻprik. The district consists of 11 urban-type settlements (Uchkoʻprik, Begobod, Gʻijdan, Katta Qashqar, Qumariqobod, Bogʻiboʻston, Mirzaxoʻja, Palaxon, Sobirjon, Turgʻoq, Yangiqishloq) and 9 rural communities.

References

Districts of Uzbekistan
Fergana Region